This article provides two lists:
A list of National Basketball Association players by total career playoff free throws made.
A progressive list of playoffs free throws made leaders showing how the record has increased through the years.

Free throw scoring leaders
This article provides a list of National Basketball Association players by total career playoff free throws made.

Statistics accurate as of the 2022 NBA playoffs.

Progressive list of playoff free throw scoring leaders

This is a progressive list of free throw scoring leaders showing how the record increased through the years.

Statistics accurate as of the 2022 NBA playoffs.''

See also
Basketball statistics
NBA post-season records

References

External links
Basketball-Reference.com enumeration of NBA career playoff leaders in free throws made

National Basketball Association lists
National Basketball Association statistical leaders